Richard Westmacott (the elder) (1747–1808) was an 18th-century monumental sculptor and the beginning of a dynasty of one of Britain's most important sculpting families. He also specialised in fireplace design for many of England's grand country houses.

Life

He was educated at Brasenose College, Oxford.

He married Sarah Vardy, daughter of Thomas Vardy, carver, and niece of John Vardy, architect, and had thirteen children by her. He also had an affair with a widow, Susan Molloy, landlady of the "Bull and Horns" public house in Fulham and had at least one child by her also.

Sadly his life-style outstripped his income and he was declared bankrupt in 1803. It is likely that he was thereafter supported by his by then successful son Richard.

He died in relative poverty in 1808.

Dynasty

His sons include: George Westmacott (c. 1770 – 1827); Thomas Westmacott (architect) (c. 1775 – 1798); Sir Richard Westmacott (1775–1856) RA (the most successful and prodigious sculptor of the family); Henry Westmacott (sculptor) (1784–1861); Charles Molloy Westmacott, illegitimate son (1782–1868) (an author who dabbled in sculpture).

His grandsons included: James Sherwood Westmacott (1823–1900) (sculptor); and Richard Westmacott (the younger) (1799–1872) (sculptor).

Works
 Fireplace for the Music Room, Cobham Hall, Kent, 1778
 Monument to Prince Sutton, Devizes, Wiltshire, 1779
 Fireplace for Corsham Court, 1780
 Marble floor, Methuen Chapel, North Wraxall Church, Somerset, 1781
 Monument to Sir Thomas Stapleton, Rotherfield Greys, Oxfordshire, 1781
 Fireplace for State Bedroom, Warwick Castle
 All ornamental fireplaces, New Gorhambury House, Hertfordshire c. 1784
 Several ornate fireplaces for the Admiralty in London, 1788
 Marble fireplace, Woburn Abbey 1790
 Monument to Sir Lister Holte, Aston, Birmingham, 1790
 Monument to Samuel Dennis, St John's College, Oxford, 1795
 Fireplaces and other ornamentation at Kensington Palace, 1796

References

 The Buildings of England, Nikolaus Pevsner

1747 births
1808 deaths
Neoclassical sculptors
British architectural sculptors
British sculptors
British male sculptors
Monumental masons